Francesco II may refer to:

 Francesco II Ordelaffi (1300–1386)
 Francesco II of Lesbos (c. 1365 – 1403/1404)
 Francesco II Acciaioli (died 1460), last Duke of Athens
 Francesco II Gonzaga, Marquess of Mantua (1466–1519), ruler of the Italian city of Mantua
 Francesco II Sforza (1495–1535), Duke of Milan from 1521 until his death
 Francesco II d'Este, Duke of Modena (1660–1694), Duke of Modena and Reggio from 1662 to 1694
 Francesco II of the Two Sicilies (1836–1894)